The 41st Dogras were an infantry regiment of the British Indian Army. They could trace their origins to 1900, when they were raised as the 41st (Dogra) Bengal Infantry.

They went to China in 1904 to join an international force, staying there until 1908. In World War I they served on the Western Front and in the Mesopotamia Campaign. There was a second battalion raised in 1917.

After World War I the Indian government reformed the army moving from single battalion regiments to multi battalion regiments. In 1922, the 41st Dogras now became the 3rd and 10th Battalions 17th Dogra Regiment. The regiment was allocated to the new Indian Army on independence.

Predecessor names
41st (Dogra) Bengal Infantry - 1900
41st Dogra Infantry - 1901
41st Dogras - 1903

References

Sources

Moberly, F.J. (1923). Official History of the War: Mesopotamia Campaign, Imperial War Museum. 

British Indian Army infantry regiments
Military units and formations established in 1900
Military units and formations disestablished in 1922
Bengal Presidency